Three Brothers was a small wooden Great Lakes lumber freighter built in 1888 by the Milwaukee Shipyard Company of Milwaukee, Wisconsin for the Chicago-based John Spry Lumber Company. Originally she was christened as the May Durr and bearing the official number 91998. She could carry  of lumber.

The machinery was Steeple Compound steam engine built by the Frontier Engine Works of Buffalo, New York in 1888.

In 1892 May Durr was renamed to John Spry. Between 1905 and 1910 the vessel was sold to the William H. White & Co. of Boyne City, Michigan, where she was renamed as Three Brothers after the White brothers William, James and Thomas of Charlevoix, Michigan. The vessel was then pressed in coarse lumber service between Lake Charlevoix and Tonawanda, New York.

On 27 September 1911, Three Brothers was carrying a load of hardwood worth of $4,200 from Boyne City to Chicago. After leaving Boyne City the vessel was sailing in heavy weather, and the hull began to leak more than usual. The water also flooded the hold and coal bunkers, forcing the firemen to use kerosene instead of coal to maintain the steam pressure.

When the vessel hit the shore the bow split open and her pilot house was knocked loose. The captain and all 13 members of crew were rescued by the life saving station staff.

After the weather subsided, the tender Favourite made an unsuccessful attempt to loosen Three Brothers, and the vessel was declared to be beyond salvage value. By 1912 the vessel had completely submerged under water.

References
 Herman G. Runge Collection, Milwaukee Public Library Marine Column, Milwaukee Sentinel, September - October, 1911 
 Chicago Inter-Ocean, September - October, 1911 
 Ports of Milwaukee & Chicago, Vessel Enrollment Master Index Wreck Report of the South Manitou US Lifesaving Station Michigan History Magazine, Nov/Dec 1996
 

Shipwrecks of Lake Michigan
Maritime incidents in 1911
Ships built in Milwaukee
Lumber ships
1888 ships
September 1911 events